Enhanced oil recovery (abbreviated EOR), also called tertiary recovery, is the extraction of crude oil from an oil field that cannot be extracted otherwise. EOR can extract 30% to 60% or more of a reservoir's oil, compared to 20% to 40% using primary and secondary recovery. According to the US Department of Energy, carbon dioxide and water are injected along with one of three EOR techniques: thermal injection, gas injection, and chemical injection. More advanced, speculative EOR techniques are sometimes called quaternary recovery.

Methods
There are three primary techniques of EOR: gas injection, thermal injection, and chemical injection. Gas injection, which uses gases such as natural gas, nitrogen, or carbon dioxide (CO2), accounts for nearly 60 percent of EOR production in the United States. Thermal injection, which involves the introduction of heat, accounts for 40 percent of EOR production in the United States, with most of it occurring in California. Chemical injection, which can involve the use of long-chained molecules called polymers to increase the effectiveness of waterfloods, accounts for about one percent of EOR production in the United States. In 2013, a technique called Plasma-Pulse technology was introduced into the United States from Russia. This technique can result in another 50 percent of improvement in existing well production.

Gas injection
Gas injection or miscible flooding is presently the most-commonly used approach in enhanced oil recovery. Miscible flooding is a general term for injection processes that introduce miscible gases into the reservoir. A miscible displacement process maintains reservoir pressure and improves oil displacement because the interfacial tension between oil and gas is reduced. This refers to removing the interface between the two interacting fluids. This allows for total displacement efficiency.
Gases used include CO2, natural gas or nitrogen. The fluid most commonly used for miscible displacement is carbon dioxide because it reduces the oil viscosity and is less expensive than liquefied petroleum gas. Oil displacement by carbon dioxide injection relies on the phase behavior of the mixtures of that gas and the crude, which are strongly dependent on reservoir temperature, pressure and crude oil composition.

Thermal injection

In this approach, various methods are used to heat the crude oil in the formation to reduce its viscosity and/or vaporize part of the oil and thus decrease the mobility ratio. The increased heat reduces the surface tension and increases the permeability of the oil. The heated oil may also vaporize and then condense forming improved oil. Methods include cyclic steam injection, steam flooding and combustion. These methods improve the sweep efficiency and the displacement efficiency. Steam injection has been used commercially since the 1960s in California fields. In 2011 solar thermal enhanced oil recovery projects were started in California and Oman, this method is similar to thermal EOR but uses a solar array to produce the steam.

In July 2015, Petroleum Development Oman and GlassPoint Solar announced that they signed a $600 million agreement to build a 1 GWth solar field on the Amal oilfield. The project, named Miraah, will be the world's largest solar field measured by peak thermal capacity.

In November 2017, GlassPoint and Petroleum Development Oman (PDO) completed construction on the first block of the Miraah solar plant safely on schedule and on budget, and successfully delivered steam to the Amal West oilfield.

Also in November 2017, GlassPoint and Aera Energy announced a joint project to create California's largest solar EOR field at the South Belridge Oil Field, near Bakersfield, California. The facility is projected to produce approximately 12 million barrels of steam per year through a 850MW thermal solar steam generator. It will also cut carbon emissions from the facility by 376,000 metric tons per year.

Steam flooding
Steam flooding (see sketch) is one means of introducing heat to the reservoir by pumping steam into the well with a pattern similar to that of water injection. Eventually the steam condenses to hot water; in the steam zone the oil evaporates, and in the hot water zone the oil expands. As a result, the oil expands, the viscosity drops, and the permeability increases. To ensure success the process has to be cyclical. This is the principal enhanced oil recovery program in use today.
 Solar EOR is a form of steam flooding that uses solar arrays to concentrate the sun's energy to heat water and generate steam. Solar EOR is proving to be a viable alternative to gas-fired steam production for the oil industry.

Fire flooding
Fire flooding works best when the oil saturation and porosity are high. Combustion generates the heat within the reservoir itself. Continuous injection of air or other gas mixture with high oxygen content will maintain the flame front. As the fire burns, it moves through the reservoir toward production wells. Heat from the fire reduces oil viscosity and helps vaporize reservoir water to steam. The steam, hot water, combustion gas and a bank of distilled solvent all act to drive oil in front of the fire toward production wells.

There are three methods of combustion: Dry forward, reverse and wet combustion. Dry forward uses an igniter to set fire to the oil. As the fire progresses the oil is pushed away from the fire toward the producing well. In reverse the air injection and the ignition occur from opposite directions. In wet combustion water is injected just behind the front and turned into steam by the hot rock. This quenches the fire and spreads the heat more evenly.

Chemical injection
The injection of various chemicals, usually as dilute solutions, have been used to aid mobility and the reduction in surface tension. Injection of alkaline or caustic solutions into reservoirs with oil that have organic acids naturally occurring in the oil will result in the production of soap that may lower the interfacial tension enough to increase production. Injection of a dilute solution of a water-soluble polymer to increase the viscosity of the injected water can increase the amount of oil recovered in some formations. Dilute solutions of surfactants such as petroleum sulfonates or biosurfactants such as rhamnolipids may be injected to lower the interfacial tension or capillary pressure that impedes oil droplets from moving through a reservoir, this is analyzed in terms of the bond number, relating capillary forces to gravitational ones. Special formulations of oil, water and surfactant, microemulsions, can be particularly effective in reducing interfacial tension. Application of these methods is usually limited by the cost of the chemicals and their adsorption and loss onto the rock of the oil containing formation. In all of these methods the chemicals are injected into several wells and the production occurs in other nearby wells.

Polymer flooding
Polymer flooding consists in mixing long chain polymer molecules with the injected water in order to increase the water viscosity. This method improves the vertical and areal sweep efficiency as a consequence of improving the water/oil mobility ratio.

Surfactants may be used in conjunction with polymers and hyperbranched polyglycerols; they decrease the interfacial tension between the oil and water. This reduces the residual oil saturation and improves the macroscopic efficiency of the process.

Primary surfactants usually have co-surfactants, activity boosters, and co-solvents added to them to improve stability of the formulation.

Caustic flooding is the addition of sodium hydroxide to injection water. It does this by lowering the surface tension, reversing the rock wettability, emulsification of the oil, mobilization of the oil and helps in drawing the oil out of the rock.

Low salinity nanofluids
EOR processes can be enhanced with nanoparticles in three ways:  nanocatalysts, nanofluids, and nanoemulsions. Nanofluids are base fluids that contain nanoparticles in colloidal suspensions. Nanofluids perform many functions in EOR of oil fields, including pore disjoining pressure, channel plugging, interfacial tension reduction, mobility ratio, wettability alteration, and asphaltene precipitation prevention. Nanofluids facilitates disjoining pressure to remove sediment entrapped oil via aggregation at the interface. Alternatively, wettability alteration and interfacial surface tension reduction are other alternative mechanism of EOR.

Microbial injection

Microbial injection is part of microbial enhanced oil recovery and is rarely used because of its higher cost and because the development is not widely accepted. These microbes function either by partially digesting long hydrocarbon molecules, by generating biosurfactants, or by emitting carbon dioxide (which then functions as described in Gas injection above).

Three approaches have been used to achieve microbial injection. In the first approach, bacterial cultures mixed with a food source (a carbohydrate such as molasses is commonly used) are injected into the oil field. In the second approach, used since 1985, nutrients are injected into the ground to nurture existing microbial bodies; these nutrients cause the bacteria to increase production of the natural surfactants they normally use to metabolize crude oil underground. After the injected nutrients are consumed, the microbes go into near-shutdown mode, their exteriors become hydrophilic, and they migrate to the oil-water interface area, where they cause oil droplets to form from the larger oil mass, making the droplets more likely to migrate to the wellhead. This approach has been used in oilfields near the Four Corners and in the Beverly Hills Oil Field in Beverly Hills, California.

The third approach is used to address the problem of paraffin wax components of the crude oil, which tend to precipitate as the crude flows to the surface, since the Earth's surface is considerably cooler than the petroleum deposits (a temperature drop of 9–10–14 °C per thousand feet of depth is usual).

Liquid carbon dioxide superfluids

Carbon dioxide (CO2) is particularly effective in reservoirs deeper than 2,000 ft., where CO2 will be in a supercritical state. In high pressure applications with lighter oils, CO2 is miscible with the oil, with resultant swelling of the oil, and reduction in viscosity, and possibly also with a reduction in the surface tension with the reservoir rock. In the case of low pressure reservoirs or heavy oils, CO2 will form an immiscible fluid, or will only partially mix with the oil. Some oil swelling may occur, and oil viscosity can still be significantly reduced.

In these applications, between one-half and two-thirds of the injected CO2 returns with the produced oil and is usually re-injected into the reservoir to minimize operating costs. The remainder is trapped in the oil reservoir by various means. Carbon dioxide as a solvent has the benefit of being more economical than other similarly miscible fluids such as propane and butane.

Water-alternating-gas (WAG) 
Water-alternating-gas (WAG) injection is another technique employed in EOR.  Water is used in addition to carbon dioxide.  A saline solution is used here so that carbonate formations in oil wells are not disturbed. Water and carbon dioxide are injected into the oil well for larger recovery, as they typically have low miscibility with oil. Use of both water and carbon dioxide also lowers the mobility of carbon dioxide, making the gas more effective at displacing the oil in the well. According to a study done by Kovscek, using small slugs of both carbon dioxide and water allows for quick recovery of the oil. Additionally, in a study done by Dang in 2014, using water with a lower salinity allows for greater oil removal, and greater geochemical interactions.

Plasma-pulse
Plasma-pulse technology is a technique used in the US as of 2013. The technology originated in the Russian Federation at the St. Petersburg State Mining University with funding and assistance from the Skolkovo Innovation Center. The development team in Russia and deployment teams across Russia, Europe and now the USA have tested this technology in vertical wells with nearly 90% of wells showing positive effects.

The Plasma-Pulse Oil Well EOR uses low energy emissions to create the same effect that many other technologies can produce except without negative ecological impact. In nearly every case the volume of water pulled with the oil is actually reduced from pre-EOR treatment instead of increased. Current clients and users of the new technology include ConocoPhillips, ONGC, Gazprom, Rosneft and Lukoil.

It is based in the same technology as the Russian pulsed plasma thruster which was used on two space ships and is currently being advanced for use in horizontal wells.

Economic costs and benefits
Adding oil recovery methods adds to the cost of oil—in the case of CO2 typically between 0.5–8.0 US$ per tonne of CO2. The increased extraction of oil on the other hand, is an economic benefit with the revenue depending on prevailing oil prices. Onshore EOR has paid in the range of a net 10–16 US$ per tonne of CO2 injected for oil prices of 15–20 US$/barrel. Prevailing prices depend on many factors but can determine the economic suitability of any procedure, with more procedures and more expensive procedures being economically viable at higher prices. Example: With oil prices at around 90 US$/barrel, the economic benefit is about 70 US$ per tonne CO2. The U.S. Department of Energy estimates that 20 billion tons of captured CO2 could produce 67 billion barrels of economically recoverable oil.

The oil and gas industry argues that the use of captured, anthropogenic carbon dioxide, derived from the exploitation of lignite coal reserves, to drive electric power generation and support EOR from existing and future oil and gas wells offers a multifaceted solution to U.S. energy, environmental, and economic challenges. There is no doubt that coal and oil resources are finite. The U.S. is in a strong position to leverage such traditional energy sources to supply future power needs while other sources are being explored and developed. For the coal industry, CO2 EOR creates a market for coal gasification byproducts and reduces the costs associated with carbon sequestration and storage.

From 1986 to 2008, the quote oil production deriving from EOR has increased from 0.3% to 5%, thanks to an increasing oil demand and a reduction of oil supply.

EOR projects with CO2 from carbon capture

Boundary Dam Power Station, Canada
SaskPower's Boundary Dam Power Station project retrofitted its coal-fired power station in 2014 with carbon capture and sequestration (CCS) technology. The plant will capture 1 million tonnes of  annually, which it sold to Cenovus Energy for enhanced oil recovery at its Weyburn Oil Field, prior to the sale of Cenovus's Saskatchewan assets in 2017 to Whitecap Resources. The project is expected to inject a net 18 million ton CO2 and recover an additional  of oil, extending the life of the oil field by 25 years. That's the equivalent of taking nearly 7 million cars off the road for a year. Since CO2 injection began in late 2000, the EOR project has performed largely as predicted. Currently, some 1600 m3 (10,063 barrels) per day of incremental oil is being produced from the field.

Petra Nova, United States
The Petra Nova project uses post-combustion amine absorption to capture some of the carbon dioxide emissions from one of the boilers at the W.A Parish power plant in Texas, and transports it by pipeline to the West Ranch oil field for use in enhanced oil recovery.

Kemper Project, United States (canceled)
Mississippi Power's Kemper County energy facility, or Kemper Project, was to have been a first-of-its-kind plant in the U.S. that was expected to be online in 2015. Its coal gasification component has since been canceled, and the plant has been converted to a conventional natural gas combined cycle power plant without carbon capture.  The Southern Company subsidiary worked with the U.S. Department of Energy and other partners with the intention to develop cleaner, less expensive, more reliable methods for producing electricity with coal that also support EOR production. The gasification technology was designated to fuel the integrated gasification combined cycle power plant. Additionally, the unique location of the Kemper Project, and its proximity to oil reserves, made it an ideal candidate for enhanced oil recovery.

Weyburn-Midale, Canada 

In 2000, Saskatchewan's Weyburn-Midale oil field began to employ EOR as a method of oil extraction. In 2008, the oilfield became the world's largest storage site of carbon dioxide. The Carbon Dioxide comes through 320 km of pipeline from Dakota Gasification facility. It is estimated that the EOR project will store around 20 million tons of Carbon Dioxide, generate about 130 million barrels of oil, and extend the life of the field by over two decades. The site is also notable as it hosted a study on the effects of EOR on nearby seismic activity.

CO2 EOR in the United States
The United States has been using CO2 EOR for several decades. For over 30 years, oil fields in the Permian Basin have implemented  EOR using naturally sourced  from New Mexico and Colorado. The Department of Energy (DOE) has estimated that full use of 'next generation' CO2-EOR in United States could generate an additional  of recoverable oil resources. Developing this potential would depend on the availability of commercial CO2 in large volumes, which could be made possible by widespread use of carbon capture and storage. The DOE estimates that if the EOR potential were to be fully realized, state and local treasuries would gain $280 billion in revenues from future royalties, severance taxes, and state income taxes on oil production, aside from other economic benefits.

The main barrier to taking further advantage of CO2 EOR in the United States has been an insufficient supply of affordable CO2. Currently, there is a cost gap between what an oilfield operation could afford to pay for CO2 under normal market conditions and the cost to capture and transport CO2 from power plants and industrial sources, so most CO2 comes from natural sources. However, using CO2 from power plants or industrial sources could reduce the carbon footprint (if the CO2 is stored underground). For some industrial sources, such as natural gas processing or fertilizer and ethanol production, the cost gap is small (potentially $10–20/tonne CO2). For other man-made sources of CO2, including power generation and a variety of industrial processes, capture costs are greater, and the cost gap becomes much larger (potentially $30–50/tonne CO2). The Enhanced Oil Recovery Initiative has brought together leaders from industry, the environmental community, labor, and state governments to advance CO2 EOR in the United States and close the price gap.

In the US, regulations can both assist and slow down the development of EOR for use in carbon capture & utilization, as well as general oil production. One of the primary regulations governing EOR is the Safe Drinking Water Act of 1974 (SDWA), which gives most of the regulatory power over EOR and similar oil recovery operations to the EPA. The agency in turn delegated some of this power to its own Underground Injection Control Program, and much of the rest of this regulatory authority to state and tribal governments, making much of EOR regulation a localized affair under the minimum requirements of the SDWA. The EPA then collects information from these local governments and individual wells to ensure they follow overall federal regulation, such as the Clean Air Act, which dictates reporting guidelines for any Carbon Dioxide sequestration operations. Beyond the atmospheric concerns, most of these federal guidelines are to ensure that the Carbon Dioxide injection causes no major damage to America's waterways. Overall, the locality of EOR regulation can make EOR projects more difficult, as different standards in different regions can slow down construction and force separate approaches to utilize the same technology.

In February 2018, Congress passed and the President signed an expansion of the carbon capture tax credits defined in section 45Q of the IRS' Internal Revenue code.  Previously, these credits were limited to $10/ton and capped at a total of 75 million tons.  Under the expansion, carbon capture and utilization projects like EOR will be eligible for a tax credit of $35/ton, and sequestration projects will receive a $50/ton credit. The expanded tax credit would be available for 12 years to any plant constructed by 2024, with no volume cap. If successful, these credits "could help sequester between 200 million and 2.2 billion metric tons of carbon dioxide" and bring down carbon capture and sequestration costs from a currently estimated $60/ton at Petra Nova to as low as $10/ton.

Environmental impacts
Enhanced oil recovery wells typically pump large quantities of produced water to the surface. This water contains brine and may also contain toxic heavy metals and radioactive substances. This can be very damaging to drinking water sources and the environment generally if not properly controlled. Disposal wells are used to prevent surface contamination of soil and water by injecting the produced water deep underground.

In the United States, injection well activity is regulated by the United States Environmental Protection Agency (EPA) and state governments under the Safe Drinking Water Act. EPA has issued Underground Injection Control (UIC) regulations in order to protect drinking water sources. Enhanced oil recovery wells are regulated as "Class II" wells by the EPA. The regulations require well operators to reinject the brine used for recovery deep underground in Class II disposal wells.

See also
 Gas reinjection
 Steam assisted gravity drainage
 Water injection (oil production)
 Wikiversity:Enhanced oil recovery

References

IPCC Special Report on Carbon dioxide Capture and Storage. Chapter 5, Underground geological storage. Intergovernmental Panel on Climate Change (IPCC), 2005.
Undeveloped Domestic Oil Resources Provide Foundation For Increasing U.S. Oil Supply pdf // US Department of Energy, analysis of EOR potential. Game Changer Improvements Could Dramatically Increase Domestic Oil Resource Recovery. An analysis by Advanced Resources International, Arlington, VA, for the U.S. Department of Energy's Office of Fossil Energy. Advanced Resources International, February 2006. See also press release

External links
Enhanced Oil Recovery Institute – University of Wyoming
Licensable Technology: Particle Stabilized Emulsions of Carbon Dioxide & Water for Enhanced Oil Recovery & Extraction Processes – Massachusetts Technology Portal
Oilfield Glossary: Enhanced Oil Recovery  – Schlumberger, Ltd.
Center for Petroleum and Geosystems Engineering – University of Texas at Austin
 Polymer Flooding, Reservoir Sweep Improvement, New Mexico Tech

Petroleum production